3 Mile is a residential suburb of Port Moresby, the capital city of Papua New Guinea. It is adjacent to Korobosea and The Port Moresby General Hospital is also inside this suburb.

Suburbs of Port Moresby